Les Angles is the name of several communes of France:

 Les Angles, Gard
 Les Angles, Hautes-Pyrénées
 Les Angles, Pyrénées-Orientales